Fakhar Hussain (born 8 July 1978) is a Pakistani first-class cricketer who played for Islamabad cricket team.

References

External links
 

1978 births
Living people
Pakistani cricketers
Islamabad cricketers
Cricketers from Gujrat